Ivan Lapšanský (born 6 November 1973) is a retired Slovak football striker and later manager.

References

1973 births
Living people
Slovak footballers
FC VSS Košice players
FK Dukla Banská Bystrica players
FC Lokomotíva Košice players
SC Untersiebenbrunn players
ŠK Futura Humenné players
Association football forwards
Slovak expatriate footballers
Expatriate footballers in Austria
Slovak expatriate sportspeople in Austria
Slovak football managers
FC VSS Košice managers